This is a list of schools in the Metropolitan Borough of Oldham in the English county of Greater Manchester.

State-funded schools

Primary schools

Alexandra Park Junior School, Oldham
Alt Academy, Alt
Bare Trees Primary School, Chadderton
Beal Vale Primary School, Shaw
Beever Primary School, Oldham
Blackshaw Lane Primary School, Royton
The Brian Clarke CE Academy, Oldham
Broadfield Primary School, Oldham
Buckstones Primary School, Shaw
Burnley Brow Community School, Chadderton
Christ Church CE Primary School, Chadderton
Christ Church CE Primary School, Denshaw
Clarksfield Primary School, Oldham
Coppice Primary Academy, Coppice
Corpus Christi RC Primary School, Chadderton
Crompton Primary School, Shaw
Delph Primary School, Delph
Diggle Primary School, Diggle
East Crompton St George's CE Primary School, Shaw
East Crompton St James' CE Primary School, Shaw
Fir Bank Primary School, Royton
Freehold Community Academy, Oldham
Friezland Primary School, Greenfield
Glodwick Infant and Nursery School, Glodwick
Greenacres Primary Academy, Oldham
Greenfield Primary School, Greenfield
Greenfield St Mary's CE School, Greenfield
Greenhill Academy, Glodwick
Hey-with-Zion Primary School, Lees
Higher Failsworth Primary School, Failsworth
Hodge Clough Primary School, Moorside
Holy Cross CE Primary School, Oldham
Holy Family RC Primary School, Oldham
Holy Rosary RC Primary School, Fitton Hill
Holy Trinity CE Primary School, Dobcross
Horton Mill Community Primary School, Glodwick
Knowsley Junior School, Springhead
Limehurst Community Primary School, Oldham
Littlemoor Primary School, Oldham
Lyndhurst Primary and Nursery School, Oldham
Mather Street Primary School, Failsworth
Mayfield Primary School, Derker
Medlock Valley Primary School, Fitton Hill
Mills Hill Primary School, Chadderton
Northmoor Academy, Oldham
Oasis Academy Clarksfield, Clarksfield
Oasis Academy Limeside, Limeside
Propps Hall Junior Infant and Nursery School, Failsworth
Richmond Academy, Oldham
Roundthorn Primary Academy, Oldham
Royton Hall Primary School, Royton
Rushcroft Primary School, Shaw
St Agnes CE Primary School, Lees
St Anne's CE Lydgate Primary School, Grasscroft
St Anne's CE Royton, Royton
St Anne's RC Primary School, Oldham
St Chad's CE Primary School, Uppermill
St Edward's RC School, Lees
St Herbert's RC School, Chadderton
St Hilda's CE Primary School, Oldham
St Hugh's CE Primary School, Oldham
St John's CE Primary School, Failsworth
St Joseph's RC Junior Infant and Nursery School, Shaw
St Luke's CE Primary School,  Chadderton
St Margaret's CE Junior Infant and Nursery School, Hollinwood
St Martin's CE Junior Infant and Nursery School, Oldham
St Mary's CE Primary School, High Crompton
St Mary's RC Primary School, Failsworth
St Matthew's CE Primary School, Chadderton
St Patrick's RC Primary School, Oldham
St Paul's CE Primary School, Royton
St Teresa's RC Primary School, Derker
St Thomas' CE Primary School, Lees
St Thomas' CE Primary School, Sholver
St Thomas' CE Primary School, Werneth
SS Aidan and Oswald's RC Primary School, Royton
South Failsworth Community Primary School, Failsworth
Springhead Infant and Nursery School, Springhead
Stanley Road Primary School, Chadderton
Thornham St James CE Primary School, Thornham
Thorp Primary School, Royton
Werneth Primary Academy, Werneth
Westwood Academy, Oldham
Whitegate End Primary and Nursery School, Chadderton
Willowpark Primary Academy, Oldham
Woodhouses Primary School, Failsworth
Woodlands Primary Academy, Oldham
Yew Tree Community School, Chadderton

Secondary schools

Blessed John Henry Newman RC College, Chadderton
The Blue Coat School, Oldham
The Brian Clarke Church of England Academy, Oldham
Co-op Academy Failsworth, Failsworth
Crompton House CE Academy, Shaw
E-ACT Royton and Crompton Academy, Royton
The Hathershaw College, Hathershaw
North Chadderton School, Chadderton
Oasis Academy Leesbrook, Oldham
Oasis Academy Oldham, Hollinwood
Oldham Academy North, Royton
The Radclyffe School, Chadderton
Saddleworth School, Uppermill
Waterhead Academy, Oldham

Special and alternative schools
Halcyon Way School, Chadderton
Hollinwood Academy, Hollinwood
Kingfisher Special School, Chadderton
Kingsland School, Watersheddings
New Bridge School, Hollinwood
Spring Brook Academy, Failsworth
The Springboard Project, Oldham

Further education
Crompton House CE Sixth Form, Shaw
North Chadderton Sixth Form, Chadderton
Oldham Sixth Form College, Oldham
The Blue Coat Sixth Form, Oldham
The Oldham College, Oldham

Independent schools

Primary and preparatory schools
The Chadderton Prepraratory School, Chadderton
Farrowdale House School, Shaw

Senior and all-through schools
Darul Hadis Latifiah Northwest, Oldham
Oldham Hulme Grammar School, Oldham
Sapience Girls Academy, Oldham
Westwood Boys School, Oldham
Westwood High, Oldham

Special and alternative schools
Bright Futures School, Greenfield
Elland House School, Royton
SMS Changing Lives, Failsworth
Teenage Works, Failsworth

References

 Schools in Oldham
 Ofsted (Office for Standards in Education)

 
Oldham